Trevor M. Lake (born 2 January 1968) is an English former footballer who played as a goalkeeper for Colchester United.

Career

Born in Orpington, Lake began his career as a trainee with West Ham United, although he failed to make a first-team appearance for the club. He joined Colchester United and made his only appearance as a professional player in a 3–1 League Cup defeat to Fulham at Craven Cottage on 18 August 1987. Lake was injured after 32 minutes, being replaced by midfielder John Reeves and forcing defender Tony English to take Lake's place in goal. Lake had kept a clean sheet until his injury forced him off the field. Following his injury, he was forced to retire from professional football on medical advice, later playing for local non-league club Stanway Rovers.

References

1968 births
Living people
Footballers from Orpington
English footballers
Association football goalkeepers
West Ham United F.C. players
Colchester United F.C. players
Stanway Rovers F.C. players